Jeannette Götte (born 13 March 1979) is a German former football midfielder. She was part of the Germany women's national football team at the 2000 Summer Olympics.

See also
 Germany at the 2000 Summer Olympics

References

External links
 
 
 Soccerpunter profile

1979 births
Living people
Sportspeople from Hagen
German women's footballers
Frauen-Bundesliga players
2. Frauen-Bundesliga players
FCR 2001 Duisburg players
SG Wattenscheid 09 (women) players
Place of birth missing (living people)
Footballers at the 2000 Summer Olympics
Women's association football midfielders
Olympic bronze medalists for Germany
Medalists at the 2000 Summer Olympics
Olympic medalists in football
Germany women's international footballers
Olympic footballers of Germany